USS YP-148 was a converted fishing vessel which served as an auxiliary patrol boat in the U.S. Navy during World War II.

History
She was laid down as seiner at the Tacoma shipyard of Western Boat Building Company for the benefit of MA Petrich. She was completed in 1940 and named Western Queen (ON 239863). In 1941, she was acquired by the U.S. Navy and designated as a Yard Patrol Craft (YP). She was one of the initial ships assigned to the Ralph C. Parker's Alaskan Sector of the 13th Naval District colloquially known as the "Alaskan Navy".

In 1946, she was transferred to the United States Maritime Administration and sold. She was renamed Mary D.

References

Auxiliary ships of the United States Navy
Ships built in Tacoma, Washington
1940 ships
Ships built by the Western Boat Building Company
Yard patrol boats of the United States Navy
Ships of the Aleutian Islands campaign